Jardine Libaire is an American writer based in Austin, Texas. She is author of the novel White Fur.

Life
Jardine is a graduate of Skidmore College and a 1997 graduate of the University of Michigan Creative Writing MFA Program, where she was a winner of the Hopwood Award. Jardine has been the recipient of residency fellowships from the Edward F. Albee Foundation, the Ucross Foundation, the Saltonstall Foundation, Brush Creek Foundation for the Arts, and OMI International Arts Center. She was also a winner of the Glascock Poetry Prize.

Jardine collaborated on the book Gravity is Stronger Here, contributing nonfiction poems that complement Phyllis B. Dooney's photographs of a family in Greenville, MS. This project won Honorable Mention for the 2016 Dorothea Lange - Paul Taylor Prize.

Bibliography
Here Kitty Kitty (Little, Brown and Company 2004) 
White Fur (Hogarth 2017)

Writing as Carolyn Says and with Hobson Brown and Taylor Materne
Miss Educated: An Upper Class Novel (Harpercollins Children's Books 2007) 
The Upper Class (Harpercollins Children's Books 2007) 
Crash Test (Harperteen 2008) 
Off Campus (Harperteen 2008)

References

External links
 Official website

Year of birth missing (living people)
Living people
Skidmore College alumni
21st-century American novelists
American women novelists
Place of birth missing (living people)
University of Michigan alumni
21st-century American women writers